Rol may refer to:

 Henri Rol-Tanguy, French resistant, "Rol" used to be his nickname during WW2
 Rol, village in Jayal tehsil, Nagaur district, in Rajasthan India
 Rolleston railway station
 Rol Cortishane, fictional character
 The Role, a 2013 Russian film by Konstantin Lopushansky

ROL, as an acronym, may refer to:

 Ray of Light, album by Madonna
 Romanian leu, Romanian currency
 Revue de l'Orient Latin, collection of medieval documents
 Raajjé Online, Maldivian Internet service provider
 Rock of Love with Bret Michaels, an American reality television dating game show
 ROtate bits Left, also known as left circular shift
 Republic of Lakotah, a proposed country and independence movement in the United States
 Rivers of Life, a global organisation of evangelical churches
 Rise of the Lycans the third installment of the Underworld film series
 Republic of Loose, an Irish band
 Risk of loss, a contracts term
 Rank order list
 Rule of law
 Ring of Lightning, an IRC network famous for two members on it leaking the secure boot backdoor key
 RISCOS Ltd, a computer software company